Dwi Rubiyanti Kholifah, commonly known as Ruby Kholifah, is an Indonesian Women's rights leader and Human rights activist. She is the Indonesian director of the Asian Muslim Action Network (AMAN).

Biography
Kholifah was born and raised in Indonesia, and completed a bachelor’s degree in literature from Universitas Jember, Indonesia and a master’s degree in health and social science at Mahidol University in Thailand, where she studied the sexual health and practices of young women in traditional Islamic schools (Pesantren). She has also been an activist with the Nahdlatul Ulama. She joined the Asian Muslim Action Network in 2005 as coordinator of the research fellowship program. 

She is currently Indonesia's director for the Asian Muslim Action Network, focusing on women in peacebuilding and interfaith cooperation. In 2014 she was selected as an Asia Foundation Development Fellow. In 2016 she was recipient of the N-Peace Award. She has spoken out about such topics as the wearing of the Hijab, rights for victims of Rape, interfaith relations, Terrorism, rights for the Ahmadiyya minority, Transgender rights, and other issues.

Recognition
She was recognized as one of the BBC's 100 women of 2014.

Publications 

 Kholifah, D. R. (2010). Contesting discourses on sexuality and sexual subjectivity among single young Muslim women in pesantren. Saarbrücken: LAP Lambert Academic Publishing.

References

Living people
Year of birth missing (living people)
Dwi Rubiyanti Kholifah
Nahdlatul Ulama
Indonesian women's rights activists
Indonesian human rights activists
BBC 100 Women